The Communist Party of the Karelo-Finnish SSR, initially known as the Communist Party (Bolshevik) of the Karelo-Finnish SSR, was the branch of the All-Union Communist Party/Communist Party of the Soviet Union in the Karelo-Finnish SSR (1940–1956).

First Secretaries of the Party

Second Secretaries of the Party 
Yuri Andropov was elected Second Secretary of the Central Committee in 1947.

References

See also
Leninist Communist Youth League of the Karelo-Finnish SSR

Karelo-Finnish
Political parties established in 1940
Parties of one-party systems
Political parties disestablished in 1956
Communist parties in the Soviet Union
1940 establishments in the Soviet Union
1956 disestablishments in the Soviet Union